Haridaspur is a village located in Gopalganj Sadar Upazila of Gopalganj District, Bangladesh.

See also
 List of villages in Bangladesh

References

Populated places in Dhaka Division
Villages in Gopalganj District, Bangladesh
Villages in Dhaka Division